Miss America 1979, the 52nd Miss America pageant, was held at the Boardwalk Hall in Atlantic City, New Jersey on September 9, 1978 on NBC Network.

Kylene Barker was the first Miss Virginia to win the crown.

Results

Placements

Order of announcements

Top 10

Awards

Preliminary awards

Non-finalist awards

Delegates

Judges
Neil J. Walsh
Mary Longely
Jerry Vale
Dr. Glenn Whitesides
Eileen Dole
Ray Sach Shroder
Renee Valente
Janet Langhart

External links
 Miss America official website

1979
1978 in the United States
1979 beauty pageants
1978 in New Jersey
September 1978 events in the United States
Events in Atlantic City, New Jersey